The Texas Outstanding Service Medal is the sixth highest military decoration that can be conferred to a service member of the Texas Military Forces. Subsequent decorations are denoted by a bronze or silver twig of four oak leaves with three acorns on the stem device.

Eligibility
The Texas Outstanding Service Medal is conferred to any service member of the Texas Military Forces serving in any capacity, whose performance has been such as to merit recognition for service performed in a superior and clearly outstanding manner, but of a lesser degree than required for a higher decoration.

Authority
The Texas Outstanding Service Medal was authorized by the Sixty-second Texas Legislature in House Bill number 30 and approved by Governor Preston Smith on 13 May 1971, effective the same date.

Description

Medal 
The medal pendant is of jeweler's bronze and is 1-1/4 of an inch in diameter. On the obverse side is a raised outline of a map of the State of Texas, encircled by the words "TEXAS OUTSTANDING SERVICE MEDAL" balanced with "OUTSTANDING" on the left "SERVICE" on the tip "MEDAL" on the right, and "TEXAS" on the bottom, in raised letters. On the reverse side of the pendant is a five-pointed raised star, 1/2 of an inch in diameter, one point up, surrounded by a wreath formed by an olive branch on the right and a live oak branch on the left, encircled by the words "STATE MILITARY FORCES" on the upper arc and "FOR SERVICE” on the lower arc, in raised letters. The pendant is suspended by a ring from a rayon moiré ribbon, 1-3/8 of an inch wide, composed of five stripes of gray alternating with five stripes of yellow, each of equal width, approximately 1/8 of an inch wide, beginning with a yellow stripe on the wearer's left.

Device 
To denote second and succeeding decorations, a bronze twig of four oak leaves with three acorns on the stem is conferred. A silver oak leaf cluster is worn in lieu of five bronze oak leaf clusters.

Notable Recipients

See also 

 Awards and decorations of the Texas Military
 Awards and decorations of the Texas government

 Texas Military Forces
 Texas Military Department
 List of conflicts involving the Texas Military

External links

Texas Outstanding Service Medal

Texas

References

Texas Military Forces
Texas Military Department